Hatton may refer to:

Places

Canada
 Hatton, Saskatchewan

England
 Hatton, Cheshire West and Chester, a former civil parish
 Hatton, Derbyshire
 Hatton, Lincolnshire
 Hatton, London, in the London Borough of Hounslow
 Hatton, Shropshire, a hamlet in the civil parish of Eaton-under-Heywood
 Hatton, Warrington, in the county of Cheshire
 Hatton, Warwickshire

Scotland
 Hatton, Aberdeenshire
 Hatton, Angus

Sri Lanka
 Hatton, Sri Lanka

United States
 Hatton, Alabama (disambiguation), multiple places
 Hatton, Arkansas
 Hatton, Kentucky
 Hatton Township, Michigan
 Hatton, Michigan, an unincorporated community
 Hatton, Missouri
 Hatton, North Dakota
 Hatton, Ohio

 Hatton, Utah
 Hatton, Washington
 Hatton, Wisconsin, a ghost town
 Hatton, Wyoming

People
 Angie Hatton (born 1972), American politician
 Ann Hatton (1764–1838), British novelist
 Bob Hatton (born 1947), English footballer
 Bobby Joe Hatton (born 1976), Puerto Rican professional basketball player
 Campbell Hatton, (born 2001) British professional boxer
 Sir Christopher Hatton (1540–1591), prominent Tudor politician
 Christopher Hatton, 1st Viscount Hatton of Grendon (1632–1706)
 Christopher Hatton, 1st Baron Hatton of Kirby (1605–1670)
 Christopher Guy Heneage Finch-Hatton, 15th Earl of Winchilsea (1911–1950)
 Dave Hatton (born 1943), English footballer
 Denys Finch Hatton (1887–1931), British big-game hunter
 Derek Hatton (born 1948), British broadcaster and former Labour Party politician
 Edward Hatton (footballer), English footballer
 Edward Hatton (surveyor), English surveyor, author of A New View of London
 Edward Anthony Hatton (1701–1783), English Dominican
 Elizabeth Hatton, 17th century society beauty
 Frank Hatton (US politician) (1846–1894), United States Postmaster-General 1884–1885
 Frank Hatton (UK politician) (1921–1978), British Labour Party Member of Parliament 1973–1978
 Grady Hatton (born 1922), retired American baseball player
  Henry Hatton, multiple people
 John Hatton (politician) (born 1933), Australian politician
 John Liptrot Hatton (1809–1886), English composer and conductor
 Les Hatton (born 1948), British mathematician and computer scientist
 Mark Hatton (luge) (born 1973), British luger
 Mark Hatton (cricketer) (born 1974), Australian cricketer
 Marion Hatton (1835–1905), New Zealand suffragist
 Matthew Hatton (born 1981), British professional boxer
 Michael Hatton (born 1951), Australian politician
 Ragnhild Hatton (1913–1995), Norwegian historian
 Raymond Hatton (1887–1971), American actor
 Ricky Hatton (born 1978), British professional boxer
 Robert H. Hatton (1826–1862), American Congressman and lawyer
 Ronald Hatton (1886–1965), English horticulturist
 Rondo Hatton (1894–1946), American actor
 Stephen Hatton (born 1948), Australian politician
 T. Alan Hatton (born c 1950), professor at MIT
 William H. Hatton (1856–1937), American politician
 William Hatton (pioneer), Early Carmel Valley, California pioneer

See also
 Hatton-Brown Publishers
 Hatton Basin, off the coast of Ireland
 Hatton Canyon, in California
 Hattin (disambiguation)

English-language surnames